Karl Wilhelm Philipp, 8th Prince of Auersperg, Duke of Gottschee (1 May 1814 in Prague – 4 January 1890 in Prague) was a Bohemian and an Austrian nobleman and statesman. He served as the first Minister-President of Cisleithania and the first President of the Austrian House of Lords (Herrenhaus).

Biography
The 8th Prince of Auersperg, Karl Wilhem, was heir to one of the most prominent princely families of the Holy Roman Empire, whose sovereign principality was mediatized in the Austrian Empire following the German Mediatisation of the post-revolutionary era. He became head of the princely House at the age of thirteen on the death of his Father, Wilhelm II of Auersperg (1782–1827). In 1851 he married Countess Ernestine Festetics de Tolna, daughter of Count Ernő János Vilmos. As he died without issue, he was succeeded by his nephew Karl Maria Alexander von Auersperg, the son of his brother Prince Adolf of Auersperg.

Political career
On the advent of the new constitutional era, in 1861, he became a member of the Upper Chamber of the Reichsrat and eventually its President.
 
As a representative of the Liberal landed proprietors of the Diet of Bohemia, and afterward as President of the Austrian House of Peers (Herrenhaus), he took a conspicuous part in defending the constitutional system against clerical and feudal reaction and the union of the Empire.

He presided over the Austrian ministry as the 1st Minister-President of Cisleithania as a result of the reorganisation of the Empire following the Austro-Hungarian Compromise of 1867.   After the term of his ministry he kept being a zealous supporter of Liberal cabinets. From 28 November 1871 to 15 February 1879, his brother Prince Adolf Wilhelm Daniel von Auersperg was also to be Minister-President of Cisleithania (the 8th).

Honours 
  Knight of the Golden Fleece, 1852 (Austrian Empire)
  Grand Cross of St. Stephen, 1863 (Austrian Empire)

See also 
 List of Ministers-President of Austria

References

External links 
 Otto 

 

 

1814 births
1890 deaths
19th-century Ministers-President of Austria
Politicians from Prague
Ministers-President of Austria
Austrian princes
Karl
Austrian people of German Bohemian descent
Knights of the Golden Fleece of Austria
Grand Crosses of the Order of Saint Stephen of Hungary